Thunder Plot is a Singaporean action drama produced by Singapore Broadcasting Corporation (SBC) (now MediaCorp) in 1994.

Story

Cast
Huang Wenyong
Eddie Kwan
Zoe Tay

References

External links
Thunder Plot theme song on YouTube
Thunder plot 惊天大阴谋 1994 on YouTube
惊天大阴谋 thunder plot last episode End on YouTube

Singapore Chinese dramas